Tom Muyters (born 5 December 1984 in Tongeren) is a former Belgian professional football goalkeeper, who last played for Roda JC Kerkrade in the Dutch Eerste Divisie.

References

External links
 
 

1984 births
Living people
Belgian footballers
Association football goalkeepers
MVV Maastricht players
S.V. Zulte Waregem players
FC Eindhoven players
Excelsior Rotterdam players
Roda JC Kerkrade players
Eredivisie players
Eerste Divisie players
Belgian Pro League players
People from Tongeren
Footballers from Limburg (Belgium)